Mark Percival (born 29 April 1994) is an English professional rugby league footballer who plays as a  for St Helens in the Super League and England at international level. 

He made his début for Saints in 2013, winning the Super League Grand Final with the club in 2014.

Background
Percival was born in Widnes, Cheshire, England. 

Percival played junior rugby for Halton Hornets before joining St Helens' academy side.

Club career
Percival made his first team début against Leeds on 1 March 2013.

St Helens reached the 2014 Super League Grand Final, and Percival was selected to play at centre in their 14–6 victory over the Wigan side at Old Trafford.
In April 2017, Percival signed a new four-year contract with Saints. He was named in the Super League Dream Team for the first time at the end of the 2017 season.
He played in the 2019 Challenge Cup Final defeat by Warrington at Wembley Stadium.

He played in the 2019 Super League Grand Final victory over Salford at Old Trafford.
Percival missed most of the 2020 Super League season with a shoulder injury.
On 17 July 2021, he played for St. Helens in their 26-12 2021 Challenge Cup Final victory over Castleford.
Percival played for St Helens in their 2021 Super League Grand Final victory over Catalans Dragons.
On 24 September 2022, Percival scored the winning try for St Helens in their 2022 Super League Grand Final victory over Leeds.
On 18 February 2023, Percival played in St Helens 13-12 upset victory over Penrith in the 2023 World Club Challenge.

International career
In 2012, Percival was selected in the England Academy squad for their tour to Australia.

Percival was selected in England's 24-man squad for the 2016 Four Nations, and made his international début in a pre-tournament warm-up game against France. 

In October 2017 he was selected in the England squad for the 2017 Rugby League World Cup. He made his only appearance of the tournament in the final group game against France, scoring a try in a 36–6 win.

In 2018 he was selected for England against France at the Leigh Sports Village.

References

External links
St Helens profile
SL profile
Statistics at rlwc2017.com
Saints Heritage Society profile

1994 births
Living people
English rugby league players
England national rugby league team players
Rochdale Hornets players
Rugby league centres
Rugby league players from Widnes
St Helens R.F.C. players